South Barracks were barracks built for the garrison in what is now the British Overseas Territory of Gibraltar. 
The barracks were built in the 1730s and were on the west side of Gibraltar overlooking the docks and the harbour. The barracks now house St. Joseph's First and Middle School.

References

Barracks in Gibraltar